Andrée Bermond (30 March 1929 – 19 September 2010) was a French alpine skier. She competed in three events at the 1952 Winter Olympics.

References

External links
 

1929 births
2010 deaths
French female alpine skiers
Olympic alpine skiers of France
Alpine skiers at the 1952 Winter Olympics
Place of birth missing